Luca Spinetti (born 23 October 1985) is a former Italian professional footballer who plays for amateur club Albalonga in Eccellenza Lazio .

Biography

Early career
Born in Rome, Lazio, Spinetti started his career at Roma. In 2003, he left Roma's Primavera team and signed by Fiorentina's Primavera youth team on a reported free transfer. He also played a friendly match for la viola against Sansovino and scored a goal. He wore no.81 shirt for first team that season.

He graduated from the youth team in 2005. He then spent 2 seasons in Serie D, for Lazio teams.

Lega Pro
In mid-2007, he was signed by Serie A club Chievo, but farmed to Serie C2 club Sansovino in co-ownership deal, along with goalkeeper Antonino Saviano, defenders Leonardo Moracci (loan), Marcus N'Ze, midfielder Maycol Andriani and forward Xhulian Rrudho. In June 2008, Chievo gave the remain 50% registration rights to Sansovino but he soon retired from professional football.

Returned to non-professional
In 2008–09 season he left for Eccellenza Lazio team Tor Tre Teste. He was the team second top-scorer with only 6 goals, behind Gianluca Toscano (30 goals). In 2009–10 Serie D season he was signed by Cynthia. In December 2010 Spinetti returned to Eccellenza Lazio.

Spinetti scored 13 goals in 2011–12 season.

References

External links
 
 LaSerieD.com Profile 
  
  

Italian footballers
A.S. Roma players
ACF Fiorentina players
Association football wingers
Footballers from Rome
1985 births
Living people
Pol. Monterotondo Lupa players